Ryan Mountain is a  mountain in Joshua Tree National Park. Ryan Mountain is a popular attraction in the park, because it leads to panoramic views of Pinto Basin, Lost Horse Valley, Queen Valley, and Pleasant Valley. It is one of the locations in Joshua Tree that features abundant lichen populations. It is named after J.D. Ryan, a wealthy rancher and early mining operator in the park.

References

 
 

Mountains of Southern California
Mountains of Riverside County, California